Ulmus laciniata var. nikkoensis Rehder, the Nikko elm, was discovered as a seedling near Lake Chūzenji, near Nikkō, Japan, and obtained by the Arnold Arboretum in 1905. The taxonomy of the tree remains a matter of contention, and has been considered possibly a hybrid of U. laciniata and U. davidiana var. japonica. However, in crossability experiments at the Arnold Arboretum in the 1970s, U. laciniata, a protogynous species, was found to be incompatible with U. davidiana var. japonica, which is protandrous.

Significantly, the variety was not recognized by Ohwi, though his reasons are not clear.

Description

Var. nikkoensis is a small tree; the specimen at the Morton Arboretum likened to a cherry tree. The tree is chiefly distinguished by leaves which are red on emergence, and toothed but not lobed as in the species. The perfect apetalous wind-pollinated flowers appear in March in England.

Pests and diseases
Heybroek found the tree provided 'relatively resistant' (to DED) progeny in the Dutch elm breeding programme.

Cultivation
There are no known cultivars of this taxon, nor is it known to be in commerce beyond the United States.

Etymology
Var. nikkoensis is named for the Nikkō National Park near the city of Nikkō, 125 km north of Tokyo.

Accessions
North America
Arnold Arboretum, US. Acc. no. 17908, collected wild in Japan.
Dawes Arboretum US.Newark, Ohio, US. 2 trees, no acc. details available.
Morton Arboretum, US. Acc. no. 180–84, received 28 February 1978 as scions from Arnold Arboretum (their accession #17908-D); 9 m tall in 2006.
Europe
Grange Farm Arboretum, Sutton St James, Spalding, Lincolnshire, UK. Acc. no. 515
Great Fontley Butterfly Conservation Elm Trials plantation, UK. One rooted root cutting planted 2021.
 Royal Botanic Gardens, Kew, UK. Acc. no. not known.

References

laciniata var. nikkoensis
Flora of Japan
Trees of Japan
Trees of Asia
Ulmus articles with images
Elm species and varieties